Heartstopper may refer to:

 Heartstopper (film), 2006
 Heartstopper (graphic novel), a young adult LGBTQ+ graphic novel and webcomic
 Heartstopper (TV series), a 2022 Netflix adaptation
 "Heartstopper" (song), by Emilíana Torrini
 "Heartstopper", a song by Keith Richards from Crosseyed Heart